Naaz may refer to:

People 
 Naaz (singer), Dutch–Kurdish singer
 Meena Kumari (1933-1972), Indian film actress, singer and poet who used the pen name Naaz
 Falaq Naaz (born 1973), Indian television actress
 Farha Naaz (born 1968), Bollywood actress
 Naaz Joshi (born 1980), Indian trans rights activist and motivational speaker
 Naaz Khialvi (1947–2010), Pakistani lyricist and radio broadcaster
 Ruhi Naaz, Nepali politician
 Shafaq Naaz (born 1975), Indian television actress

Other uses 
 Naaz islands, tidal islands in the Persian Gulf